Baker Lake ('where the river widens') is a lake in the Kivalliq Region, Nunavut, Canada. It is fed by the Thelon River from the west and the Kazan River from the south. It outflows into Chesterfield Inlet. It has several named bays, and a few islands.

In 1762 William Christopher reached Baker Lake via Chesterfield Inlet. The Inuit hamlet of Baker Lake is at the west end of the lake near the mouth of the Thelon River. Although the Inuit had been in the area for some time, the first outside presence was the Royal North-West Mounted Police post at the east end of the lake in 1915. This was followed in 1916 by the Hudson's Bay Company post set up at the Kazan River delta until 1930 when it moved to its present location.

Fauna
The lake's area is home to Beverly and Qamanirjuaq Caribou herds, as well as other wildlife associated with northern Canada's Arctic.

See also
List of lakes of Nunavut
List of lakes of Canada

References

External links

Hamlet of Baker Lake
Atlas of Canada, Lakes of Nunavut 

Lakes of Kivalliq Region
Hudson's Bay Company trading posts in Nunavut